Haedropleura is a genus of sea snails, marine gastropod mollusks in the family Horaiclavidae.

It was formerly included within the subfamily Crassispirinae, family Turridae.

According to Nordsieck (1968, 1977) and Van Aartsen et al. (1984) Haedropleura Bucquoy, Dautzenberg & Dollfus, 1883 is a junior synonym of Bellaspira Conrad, 1868. The latter gets priority. However, this not backed by distinctions at the genus level, which puts Bellaspira in the family Drilliidae. Their characters have been poorly defined until the study by Scarponi, Daniele, Giano Della Bella, and Alessandro Ceregato. "The genus Haedropleura (Neogastropoda, Toxoglossa-Conoidea) in the Plio-Quaternary of the Mediterranean basin." Zootaxa 2796.1 (2011): 37-55.

Species
Species within the genus Haedropleura include:
 † Haedropleura brebioni Landau, Van Dingenen & Ceulemans, 2020 
 † Haedropleura bucciniformis (Bellardi, 1847) (synonym of Raphitoma bucciniformis Bellardi, 1847)
 † Haedropleura contii (Bellardi, 1877) (synonym of Bela contii Bellardi, 1877)
 Haedropleura continua (Melvill, J.C. & R. Standen, 1903)
 Haedropleura flexicosta Monterosato, 1884
 Haedropleura forbesi Locard, 1891 (taxon inquirendum)
 † Haedropleura formosa Scarponi, Daniele, Giano Della Bella, and Alessandro Ceregato, 2011
 † Haedropleura fratemcontii Ceulemans, Van Dingenen & Landau, 2018 
 † Haedropleura gallica Landau, Van Dingenen & Ceulemans, 2020 
 Haedropleura hanleyi Locard, 1892 (taxon inquirendum)
 † Haedropleura heptagonalis Cossmann, 1913
 Haedropleura horma W.-M. Feng, 1996
 Haedropleura ima (Bartsch, 1915)
 Haedropleura laeta (Thiele, 1925)
 † Haedropleura ligeriana Landau, Van Dingenen & Ceulemans, 2020 
 † Haedropleura maitreja (Koenen, 1872)
 † Haedropleura miocaenica (Boettger, 1902)
 † Haedropleura orientalis Vredenburg, 1923  
 † Haedropleura parva  Scarponi, Daniele, Giano Della Bella, and Alessandro Ceregato, 2011
 Haedropleura pellyi (Smith, 1882)
 Haedropleura pygmaea (Dunker, 1860)
 Haedropleura ryalli Horro, Gori & Rolán, 2010
 Haedropleura secalina (Philippi, 1844)
 Haedropleura septangularis (Montagu, 1803)
 Haedropleura summa Kilburn, 1988
Species brought into synonymy
 Haedropleura beetsi Glibert, 1960: synonym of Cytharella beetsi (Glibert, 1960)
 Haedropleura crystallina Boettger, 1906:synonym of Nitidiclavus crystallinus (Boettger, 1906)
 Haedropleura dora Thiele, 1925: synonym of Haedropleura ima (Bartsch, 1915)
 Haedropleura fukuchiana Yokoyama, 1922: synonym of Haedropleura pygmaea (Dunker, 1860)
 Haedropleura maltzani Knudsen, 1952: synonym of Anacithara maltzani (Knudsen, 1952)
 Haedropleura melita Dall, 1919: synonym of Pyrgocythara melita (Dall, 1919)
 Haedropleura rigida Reeve, 1846: synonym of Haedropleura septangularis rigida (Reeve, 1846)
 Haedropleura septangularis albida Monterosato, 1878: synonym of Haedropleura septangularis (Montagu, 1803)
 Haedropleura septangularis fulva Monterosato, 1878: synonym of Haedropleura septangularis (Montagu, 1803)
 Haedropleura septangularis maculata Monterosato, 1878: synonym of Haedropleura septangularis (Montagu, 1803)

References

 Cossmann (M.), 1913 Étude comparative de fossiles miocéniques recueillis à la Martinique et à l'Isthme de Panama. Journal de Conchyliologie, t. 61, vol. 1, p. 1-64
 Scarponi D., Della Bella G. & Ceregato A. (2011b). The genus Haedropleura (Neogastropoda, Toxoglossa=Conoidea) in the Plio-Quaternary of the Mediterranean basin.  Zootaxa,  2796:37-55

External links
  Tucker, J.K. 2004 Catalog of recent and fossil turrids (Mollusca: Gastropoda). Zootaxa 682:1-1295.

 
Horaiclavidae
Gastropod genera